The following is a list of Georgia Southern Eagles men's basketball head coaches. There have been 15 head coaches of the Eagles in their 92-season history.

Georgia Southern's current head coach is Charlie Henry. He was hired as the Eagles' head coach in March 2023, replacing Brian Burg, who was fired after the 2022-2023 season.

References

Georgia Southern

Georgia Southern Eagles men's basketball coaches